Ram Singh Kuka  (3 February 1816 – 29 November 1885) was the second guru (religious leader) of the Namdhari sect of Sikhism. He is credited as being the first British Indian to use non-cooperation and boycott of British goods and services as a political tool. He was exiled to Rangoon, Burma (Myanmar) by the British colonial government of India on 18 January 1872.

Biography 
Ram Singh was born in a small-farming Tarkhan family to mother Sada Kaur and father Jassa Singh. He lived in the village of Raiyan, near Sri Bhaini Sahib, Ludhiana. He was raised without an education and only learnt how to become a carpenter when he grew up, although he did not succeed in that so his father sent him to the army of the Sikh Empire at age 20 under Sher Singh. As the empire fell apart after the death of Maharaja Ranjit Singh, concerns over British power and Sikh decline led him to galvanize his followers (of mostly humble origin) to proclaim a new "Kuka Khalsa" to restore Sikh prestige.

Ram Singh Kuka was a member of a unit of Prince Naunial Singh's platoon, the Baghel Regiment. His regiment was sent to Peshawar to bring the royal coffers. On its way back, the unit rested at Hazro Fort, now in Pakistan. It is said that Ram Singh and some soldiers of his regiment went to meet Balak Singh of the Namdharis. Balak Singh was overjoyed to see Ram Singh and according to folklore told him: "I had been waiting for you." He told Ram Singh Kuka that he was the next in line to Balak Singh. 

Balak Singh gave him "Patasha" (sugar bubbles), a coconut, five paise coins and took five rounds around him in reverence and bowed before him, making him his successor.

Gallery

References

1816 births
Year of death missing
19th-century Indian philosophers
Sikh gurus